Beckerina is a genus of flies in the family Phoridae.

Species
B. aequatoriana Borgmeier & Prado, 1975
B. aliena Malloch, 1924
B. burmicola Beyer, 1958
B. chelifera Borgmeier, 1923
B. costaricana Borgmeier, 1932
B. dactylata Borgmeier, 1969
B. dominicana Borgmeier, 1969
B. irregularis Borgmeier, 1925
B. lehmanni Enderlein, 1927
B. luteihalterata Borgmeier, 1925
B. luteola Malloch, 1919
B. neotropica Brues, 1919
B. nudipleura Borgmeier, 1925
B. pilipleura Borgmeier, 1971
B. polysticha Schmitz, 1939
B. setifrons Borgmeier, 1969
B. similata Malloch, 1923
B. umbrimargo (Becker, 1901)

References

Phoridae
Platypezoidea genera